The 2015 VLN Series was the 38th season of the VLN.

A fatal accident occurred during the opening round of the season, claiming the life of 49-year-old Dutch spectator Andy Gehrmann and injuring nine other spectators. The No. 23 Nissan GT-R Nismo GT3 of Jann Mardenborough unexpectedly took off at the Flugplatz, hit the barrier and bounced over the catch fencing, into the crowd.

Calendar

Race Results
Results indicate overall winners only.

Footnotes

References

External links 
 
 

2015 in German motorsport
Nürburgring Endurance Series seasons